Ctenophryne aequatorialis (common name: Cuenca Nelson frog, reflecting its earlier placement in Nelsonophryne) is a species of frog in the family Microhylidae. It is endemic to the Andes of Ecuador and known from the Cuenca basin in Azuay Province southward to Saraguro Canton (northern Loja Province) at elevations of  asl.

Description
The dorsum has characteristic pattern of dark patches. The toes have basal webbing.

Habitat and conservation
The species inhabits pastures, grassland, agricultural fields, and degraded secondary habitats. They have been collected close to small pools. Eggs are laid in small pools. The tadpoles reach metamorphosis after three months.

In Ecuador it is considered "endangered" because of its relatively small range, few known and presumably fragmented populations, and presumed decline in abundance. It might be present in the El Cajas National Park.

References

aequatorialis
Frogs of South America
Amphibians of the Andes
Amphibians of Ecuador
Endemic fauna of Ecuador
Taxa named by Mario Giacinto Peracca
Amphibians described in 1904
Taxonomy articles created by Polbot